Santa Croce del Sannio is a comune (municipality) in the Province of Benevento in the Italian region Campania, located about 70 km northeast of Naples and about 30 km north of Benevento.

Santa Croce del Sannio borders the following municipalities: Castelpagano, Cercemaggiore, Circello, Morcone.

References

Cities and towns in Campania